Yeah, I Said It is a humor book by comedian Wanda Sykes. It contains jokes and rants about diverse topics such as sex, politics, war, homeland security, the death penalty, family, crime, guns, and race.

References
Amazon.com profile

2004 books
Atria Publishing Group books